This is the discography of American rock band the Knack.

Albums

Studio albums

Live albums

Compilation albums

Video albums

Singles

Notes

References

Discographies of American artists
Rock music group discographies
New wave discographies